The Northern Ute Tribe is one of three ethnically-related Ute Tribes. The Northern Ute Tribe occupies and administers the Uintah and Ouray Indian Reservation in northeastern Utah. The population of the Northern Ute Tribe is approximately 3,500. 

In 1965, the Northern Ute Tribe agreed to allow the United States Bureau of Reclamation to divert a portion of its water from the Uinta Basin (part of the Colorado River Basin) to the  Great Basin. The diversion would provide water supply for the Bonneville Unit of the Central Utah Project. In exchange, the Bureau of Reclamation agreed to plan and construct the Unitah, Upalco, and Ute Indian Units of the Central Utah Project to provide storage of the Tribe's water. By 1992, the Bureau of Reclamation had made little or no progress on construction of these facilities. To compensate the Tribe for the Bureau of Reclamation's failure to meet its 1965 construction obligations, Title V of the Central Utah Project Completion Act (P.L. 102-575), enacted in 1992, contains the Ute Indian Rights Settlement. Under the settlement, the Northern Tribe received $49.0 million for agricultural development, $29.5 million for recreation and fish and wildlife enhancement, and $125 million for economic development. The Ute Indian Rights Settlement is administered by the United States Department of the Interior.

References

See also
Uinta Indian Irrigation Project

Ute tribe